The Fiction Maze is the fourth studio album by Swedish power metal band Persuader. The band describes the album as "the perfect mix of everything we've done so far, expanded on the Persuader sound while keeping the core that is the band" and "a beast of an album, the true pinnacle of our career so far." In an interview with Swedish newspaper Västerbottens-Kuriren, Emil noted that the album is "a little more aggressive and a little heavier" than their previous work. The album is Persuader's first release in seven years.

On September 11, 2013, Persuader announced they had signed with Inner Wound Recordings.

Track listing

Personnel 

Persuader
Jens Carlsson – vocals
Emil Norberg – lead guitar
Daniel Sundbom – rhythm guitar
Fredrik Hedström – bass
Efraim Juntunen – drums

Production
Ronnie Björnström – mixing and mastering
Felipe Machado Franco – artwork

References 

2014 albums
Persuader albums